Son of Pain is the debut album by Governor. Released under Grand Hustle on September 12, 2006, it peaked at 50 on the U.S. Billboard Top R&B/Hip-Hop Albums chart.

Track listing

Charts

References

2006 albums
Albums produced by Just Blaze
Albums produced by Raphael Saadiq
Albums produced by Scott Storch
Contemporary R&B albums by American artists
Grand Hustle Records albums